Bunmi Koko was a Luxury Fashion Brand, based in London, England. Creative Director Bunmi Olaye and partner Francis Udom founded Bunmi Koko in 2009. The name was inspired by the designer's first name 'Bunmi' (which means 'God gave me') and the nickname given to her by her partner Francis; "Koko" (meaning my other half'). The two phrases joined to mean, "God gave me my other half."

History 
Based in London, the brand designs stem from Bunmi's and Francis' Nigerian/Scottish heritage. Bunmi Koko also stresses "diversity and inclusion" as part of their mission statement. The joint work of Bunmi and Francis has resulted in the creation of Longitudinal Caissons: a new method of creating tubular silhouettes in fabric. In December 2011, Bunmi resigned from her role as the Creative Director of Bunmi Koko in order to take a break from the limelight to pursue other personal interests.
In January 2012, Bunmi Koko Ltd stopped trading and the company was eventually dissolved by Companies House in August 2013.

Designer Profile 
Bunmi Olaye was born in Nigeria and came to the UK to study at St Margaret's School, Bushey in Hertfordshire. Her first fashion degree was an undergraduate foundation course at Wimbledon School of Art where she gained a National Diploma in Art & Design. She went straight on to study Fashion Promotion at the Kent Institute of Art & Design, which led to her working as a fashion stylist and illustrator in London. Bunmi then went on to work for luxury companies such as Anne Fontaine, Harrods and Prada before going back to study at the London College of Fashion, where she undertook the FdA Styling & Photography course. She also ventured off to take a Fashion Design & Marketing Degree at the University of East London, where she was awarded a special prize for Female Entrepreneurship in 2010 and currently appointed by the Vice-Chancellor, Professor Patrick McGhee, as their ambassador for Female Entrepreneurship. Whilst studying, she made clothes for individual clients, most notably former Spice Girl – Mel B and in her sandwich year, she worked with couture designer Allison Rodger and Alexander McQueen and the luxury fashion brand Louis Vuitton under the LVMH group. While in Aberdeen, Bunmi Olaye met Scottish based engineer, Francis Udom (CEO) and their union inspired them both to start Bunmi Koko. Bunmi was the Creative Director of the luxury brand, Bunmi Koko.
Following on from her resignation, she still designs for her private clients and has plans to launch her own label in the near future.

Products 
The brand focuses on luxury ready-to-wear and couture garments for bridal and evening wear. The brand's portfolio of luxury products and services is growing into accessories for womenswear and menswear, special designs (bespoke corporate gifts, gift cards, illustrations) and interior design. The brand wants to expand as a lifestyle brand with plans to produce accessories such as sunglasses, shoes, as well as beauty products such as cosmetics. The brand uses European fabric for most of her products, with careful emphasis placed on detailing. As well as selling their products online, Bunmi Koko sell their garments at a range of stockists across the world ranging from Scotland to Nigeria, South Africa, and Brazil.

Branding 
The fashion label uses celebrities to further enhance their branding, with significant contributions from former Spice Girl, Mel B. The brand has also caught the attention of several other personalities like First Lady Michelle Obama, Hilary Alexander, Mel B, Mischa Barton, Michelle Williams, Kelly Rowland, Mica Paris, Estelle and Alex Gerrard. In two years, the brand managed to be featured in magazines and newspapers such as Drapers, Evening Standard, Scottish Daily Record, Black Hair, Grazia, Glamour, Cosmopolitan, Arise, Fiasco, Destiny, Idol.

Collections

Ready-to-wear 
 Geisha's Reform – Autumn/Winter 2010
 Matriarchy – Spring/Summer 2010
 Kaleidoscopia – Autumn/Winter 2011

Couture
 Bridal
 Eveningwear

Awards

Events 
Bunmi Koko participated in many fashion events, including:
 African Fashion Week 30 June 2010
 African Fashion Awards 5 July 2010
 Vauxhall Fashion Scout during London Fashion Week 11 September 2010
 Vauxhall Fashion Scout during London Fashion Week 22 February 2011
 Arise Magazine Fashion Week 10 March 2011
 Royal Reception at St James' Palace by invite from HRH Prince Charles

Nelson Mandela 
Bunmi Olaye and Francis Udom were invited to Nelson Mandela's home in Johannesburg on 5 July 2010. Graca Mandela then suggested Michelle Obama as a potential client for Bunmi Koko.

Nigeria: The Road to the Centenary (1914 – 2014) 
The duo were invited to the  "Nigeria: The Road to the Centenary (1914-2014)" event organised by the CEO and Chairman of THISDAY/ARISE publications, Nduka Obaigbena, held at Banqueting House. This event marked the start of celebrations to commemorate Nigeria's centenary as an amalgamated nation. Notably, Olaye and Udom met Gordon Brown on the event that took place on 28 November 2010.

Wedding of Prince William and Catherine Middleton  
Bunmi was invited by ITN to give 'expert commentary' on the wedding gown worn by HRH Catherine Middleton, The Duchess of Cambridge, on the ITV Royal Wedding Coverage during the day of HRH Prince William and Duchess Catherine Middleton's Royal Wedding. During the live interview, Bunmi also gave her fashion input about the wedding guests' outfits with her fellow panelists. Earlier upon announcing the engagement, Bunmi Olaye was also invited by ITN to comment on the possible wedding dress The Duchess will choose for the Royal Wedding to Prince William. Bunmi was interviewed by ITN reporter Nina Nanna and the piece to camera was run all day on ITV News as part of the coverage for the announcement of the Royal engagement.

Collaborations

World Food Programme 
Following their meeting with Nelson Mandela, the brand collaborated with United Nations World Food Program (WFP) to produce products such as the Red Cup Label scarf and a MacBook case. Half of the profits arising from each sale of a Bunmi Koko-designed WFP product will go towards feeding hungry children

University of East London 
Bunmi is an alumna of the university, and her brand's headquarters is in the Knowledge Dock Centre at the university. She has a close relationship with the university, as she is the Ambassador for Female Entrepreneurship of the University of East London. Bunmi also represented them in the Graduate Fashion Week 2010 and caught a lot of attention from that event. The brand announced their first Design & Innovation Award given to a UEL Graduate at Graduate Fashion Week 2011. The 2011 winner was UEL Graduate, Le Thuy Le Thi.

RocketHub 
RocketHub has worked with Bunmi Koko, amongst other clients, to raise funds and awareness for certain creative projects including London Fashion Week 2010.

References

External links 
 Bunmi Koko website

Clothing brands of the United Kingdom
Clothing brands of Nigeria